Haina is a village and a former municipality in the district of Hildburghausen, in Thuringia, Germany. Since 31 December 2012, it is part of the town Römhild. It was the birthplace of Hans Hut (c. 1490–6 December 1527), an Anabaptist in Southern Germany and Austria.

Sons and daughters of the village

 Christian Heurich, brewer; founder of Christian Heurich Brewing Company of Washington, DC (born 12 September 1842, in Haina, died 7 March 1945, in Washington, DC)

References

Former municipalities in Thuringia